Slaven Zambata (24 September 1940 – 29 October 2020) was a Croatian professional football player best known for his time at Dinamo Zagreb in the 1960s, for whom he appeared in 171 Yugoslav First League matches. He was also a Yugoslav international, scoring 21 goals in 31 matches for the national side.

Club career
Zambata started playing football at his hometown club Junak Sinj and was signed by Dinamo Zagreb in 1959, at the age of eighteen. He stayed with the Croatian powerhouse until 1969, and during this time earned a total of 393 appearances and scored 267 goals (93 of which in the Yugoslav First League). He won four Yugoslav Cups with Dinamo (in 1960, 1963, 1965 and 1969) and also captained the team to their triumph in the 1966–67 Inter-Cities Fairs Cup in a campaign that saw Zambata scoring six goals. He also finished as Cup runner-up on two occasions (in 1964 and 1966) and was Inter-Cities Fairs Cup runner-up in 1963. After leaving Dinamo in 1969 he played for a few seasons for Belgian clubs KSV Waregem and Crossing Club before returning shortly to Zagreb in 1972. He quit playing football in 1973 after a couple of serious injuries (he had surgery performed on both of his menisci just before his retirement).

As of 2009, he was the 8th most prolific goalscorer in Dinamo's history, and one of two players to score a hat-trick in a Yugoslav Cup final game, against Hajduk Split on 26 May 1963. Although Dinamo never won the Yugoslav championship during his ten years with the club, they did finish as runners-up five times (in 1960, 1963, 1966, 1967 and 1969) in one of the most successful periods in the history of the club.

International career
Considered one of the best Yugoslav forwards of the 1960s, Zambata had two appearances and netted two goals for Yugoslavia U-21 selection, before debuting for Yugoslavia on 16 September 1962 in a friendly against East Germany in Leipzig. He went on to earn 31 caps and scored 21 goals, and during his international career he captained Yugoslavia at the 1964 Olympics in Tokyo, where they finished sixth out of 16 teams. His last international match was on 27 October 1968 against Spain in Belgrade.

Honours
Yugoslav Football Cup: 1960, 1963, 1965, 1969
Inter-Cities Fairs Cup: 1966–67

References

External links
 
  
Slaven Zambata at Reprezentacija.rs 
 
 
 Slaven Zambata at gnkdinamo.hr 

1940 births
2020 deaths
People from Sinj
Association football forwards
Yugoslav footballers
Yugoslavia under-21 international footballers
Yugoslavia international footballers
Olympic footballers of Yugoslavia
Footballers at the 1964 Summer Olympics
NK Junak Sinj players
GNK Dinamo Zagreb players
K.S.V. Waregem players
K.V.V. Crossing Elewijt players
Yugoslav First League players
Belgian Pro League players
Yugoslav expatriate footballers
Expatriate footballers in Belgium
Yugoslav expatriate sportspeople in Belgium